Srikant Nirala was an Indian politician. He was elected to the Bihar Legislative Assembly from Maner (Vidhan Sabha constituency) from 1990 to 1995, 1995–2000, and 2005–2010 as a member of Bihar Legislative Assembly as a member of the Rashtriya Janata Dal. Srikant Nirala left RJD in 2010 and joined JDU. His father also served as a member of Bihar Legislative Assembly & former Minister of Bihar, Ram Nagina Singh thrice from this constituency & his mother also served as a member of Bihar Legislative Assembly, Rajmati Devi twice from this constituency. He left JDU to join BJP in 2015. Now he was an Independent.

References

Living people
Year of birth missing (living people)
Bihari politicians
Magadh University alumni
Rashtriya Janata Dal politicians
Bihar MLAs 1990–1995
Bihar MLAs 1995–2000
Bihar MLAs 2000–2005
Janata Dal (United) politicians
Janata Dal politicians
Indian National Congress politicians from Bihar